Mercian Cycles is a custom bicycle manufacturer based in Derby, England. The firm was founded by Tom Crowther and Lou Barker in 1946 and named after the ancient kingdom of Mercia.  Early frames built by Mercian were known as "crowbars", a pun on the surnames of Crowther and Barker. Mercian Cycles operated a retail shop in Alvaston until early 2019, when it relocated back to its manufacturing unit within Derby.

As of 2010, production was around 300 to 400 frames per year, with 20% being exported outside the United Kingdom; in the same period, touring bicycles accounted for around 67% of Mercian's production, with track bicycles making up another 25%.

Frames are generally custom-built to a rider's required dimensions, and may use hand-cut lugs. Mercian frames were traditionally built using steel, originally Reynolds 531, though as of 2010, newer steels such as Reynolds 853 and Reynolds 953 and part-carbon construction were in use. Before steel was superseded by lighter materials, riders using Mercian won national and international competitions.

From the original founders, the business passed to Ethel Crowther, ex-wife of founder Tom Crowther. It then passed to Mercian framebuilder Bill Betton. In 2002, Mercian Cycles was acquired by Grant Mosely and Jane Mosely.

Mercian has recently commissioned frame colour schemes from designer Sir Paul Smith, who owns and rides several Mercian track bikes.

Notes

References
  (This article about Mercian Cycles formed part of the magazine's "Made in Britain" series about the UK bicycle industry.)

External links

Cycle manufacturers of the United Kingdom
Companies based in Derby